Starbuck Cirque is a remarkable cirque, 4 nautical miles (7 km) wide, between the base of Tentacle Ridge and Mount Hughes in Cook Mountains. Named by Advisory Committee on Antarctic Names (US-ACAN) after Michael J. Starbuck, United States Geological Survey (USGS) cartographer who, with Roger A. Barlow, operated the seismometer and Doppler satellite receiving stations at South Pole, winter 1992; member of US-NZ field team in a program to combine US and NZ geodetic networks in the McMurdo Dry Valleys area, summer 1996–97.

Cirques of Antarctica
Landforms of Oates Land